Daily Voice, or The Daily Voice, may refer to one of several news entities:

 Daily Voice (South African newspaper), a Western Cape tabloid newspaper started in 2005
 The Daily Voice (African American news website), a U.S. online news site started in 2008, now defunct
 The Daily Voice (U.S. hyperlocal news), a U.S. online hyperlocal news site started in 2010 as Main Street Connect

Also:

 Dnevni avaz (English: Daily Voice), a Sarajevo daily newspaper started in 1993